A legislative scorecard, in North American parlance, refers to any ranked balanced scorecard used by advocacy groups to rank sitting legislators or candidates for legislative office on their voting record. It is also used to refer to ranked indexes of introduced or ratified legislation on certain criteria. 

Scorecards are usually aggregated on an annual basis, and are often composed by political advocacy groups as educative tools for voters in their decision-making at the ballot box. They are also useful for endorsement of candidates by other organizations.

Notable legislative scorecards

 AFL–CIO
 American Civil Liberties Union
 American Conservative Union
 Americans for Democratic Action
 Americans for Prosperity
 Family Research Council
 FreedomWorks
 Heritage Action
 Human Rights Campaign
 Humane Society
 League of Conservation Voters
 NAACP
 National Taxpayers Union
 Planned Parenthood
 Progressive Public Health and Environmental Scorecard (National Nurses United, Food & Water Watch, and Progressive Democrats of America)

References

Lobbying in the United States